Palais Rothschild refers to a number of palaces in Vienna, Austria, which were owned by members of the Austrian branch of the Rothschild banking family. Apart from their sheer size and elegance, they were famous for the huge collections of valuable paintings, statues, furniture, books and armour that they housed, another reflection of the family's vast wealth and prominent position.

The collections were confiscated by the Nazis in 1938, and the palaces were stripped and ruined during World War II. After the war, the heirs received little compensation. What remained of the buildings was sold off, or destroyed and replaced by modern office buildings. The history of these palaces and the art collections they contained is symbolic of the rise and fall of the Austrian branch of the Rothschild family.

The palaces 
The five main Rothschild palaces (Palais Rothschild) in Vienna were:
 Palais Albert Rothschild (demolished in 1954)
 Palais Nathaniel Rothschild (demolished after 1945)
 
 Palais Rothschild (Prinz-Eugen-Straße)

The Rothschild collections
The extensive art collections of Louis and Alphonse de Rothschild had to be, in effect, given away by their heirs to the Republic of Austria. Complicated laws and bureaucratic red tape made a full restitution almost impossible. The heirs were forced by the state to sell off their belongings, since they were effectively insolvent.

Since Austria regarded itself as a victim of Nazism, and not as one of the perpetrators, Austrian Jewish victims could barely appeal to the courts on their status. Much of the former Rothschild art collection was taken either to the Kunsthistorisches Museum (KHM) or to the Austrian Gallery in the Belvedere palace.

In the late 1990s, due to outside pressure from the United States, a more thorough examination of its role and behaviour during the Second World War took place in Austria. After long and tedious negotiations, the Austrian government agreed in 1999 to return or pay for the roughly 250 Rothschild art treasures that were looted by the Nazis and absorbed into Austrian State Museums. The items were restituted to the heirs in 1999.

Works from the Rothschild collection that used to be kept at the Kunsthistorisches Museum include:

 Aelbert Cuyp, Landscape with Shepherd and Herd
 Frans Hals, Tielemann Roostermann
 Frans Hals, Portrait of a Man
 Frans Hals, Portrait of a Woman
 Hans de Jode, Muleteer
 Gabriel Metsu, Girl and Officer
 Isaac van Ostade, Stop at the inn
 Hyacinthe Rigaud, Count Philipp Ludwig Wenzel Sinzendorf
 David Teniers the Younger, Archduke Leopold Wilhelm in his gallery in Brussels
 Jan Wynants, Landscape with Hunters

In the Österreichische Galerie Belvedere:
 Heinrich Angelt, Portrait of a Woman

See also 
 History of Jews in Austria
 National Fund of the Republic of Austria for Victims of National Socialism

References

Further reading 
 Gabriele Anderl, Alexandra Caruso (ed.). NS-Kunstraub in Österreich und die Folgen. Studienverlag, Innsbruck. 2005. 
 Michaela Feurstein, Gerhard Milchram. Jüdisches Wien. Boehlau Verlag, Vienna. 2001. 
 Peter Harclerode, Brendan Pittaway. Lost Masters. Welcome Rain Publishers. 2000. 
 Gert Kerschbaumer. Meister des Verwirrens: Die Geschäfte des Kunsthändlers Friedrich Welz. Czernin Verlag, Vienna. 2000. 
 Dieter Klein, Martin Kupf, Robert Schediwy (Ed.) Stadtbildverluste Wien – Ein Rückblick auf fünf Jahrzehnte. LIT Verlag, Vienna. 2005. 
 Sophie Lillie. Was einmal war: A Handbook of Vienna's Plundered Art Collections. Czernin Verlag, Vienna. 2003. 
 Verena Pawlowsky, Harald Wendelin (ed.). Die Republik und das NS-Erbe. Band 1 der Reihe Raub und Rückgabe – Österreich von 1938 bis heute. Mandelbaum Verlag, Vienna. 2005. 
 Thomas Trenkler. Der Fall Rothschild: Chronik einer Enteignung. Czernin Verlag, Vienna. 1999.

External links 

 National Fund of the Republic of Austria for Victims of National Socialism
 Institute for the History of Jews in Austria
 Holocaust Victims' Information and Support Center
 Republic of Austria | Historikerkommission
 The Rothschild Archive

Rothschild family residences
Rotschild
Jewish Austrian history